Mike Hewitt may refer to:
 Mike Hewitt (footballer) (born 1955), retired Scottish football goalkeeper
 Mike Hewitt (politician), American politician in the Washington State Senate